Zhouning County (Foochow Romanized: Ciŭ-nìng-gâing) is a county of northeastern Fujian province, People's Republic of China. It is under the administration of the prefecture-level city of Ningde.

Administrative divisions
Towns:
Shicheng, Xiancun, Puyuan, Qibu, Lidun, Chunchi

Townships:
Siqiao Township, Limen Township, Makeng Township

Climate

References

County-level divisions of Fujian
Ningde